Yang Shaohua (born 1931) is a Chinese xiangsheng comedian and actor.

Biography
Yang was born in Beijing, China in 1931. His father died before he was born and his mother died when he was very young. In 1944, he became a disciple of Guo Qirong, and began performing xiangsheng at Beijing Qiming Tea Club. After the establishment of the Communist State in 1951, he moved to Tianjin and worked at Daming Iron and Steel Factory. After the Cultural Revolution, he was transferred to Tianjin Opera Group. He began performing xiangsheng with Ma Zhiming, a renowned xiangsheng comedian, in 1970s. In 2018, Yang had appeared in the CCTV New Year's Gala show.

Personal life
Yang married Ouyang Sufen. The couple has five children, in order of birth: Yang Wei, Yang Jinming, Yang Lun, Yang Jian and Yang Yi.

Filmography

Film

Television

References

1931 births
Living people
Chinese xiangsheng performers
Chinese male comedians
Male actors from Beijing
Chinese male television actors
Chinese male film actors